The Resurrection of Christ is a 1611-1612 triptych painting by Peter Paul Rubens, now in the Cathedral of Our Lady in Antwerp.

The centre panel depicts the Risen Jesus triumphantly emerging from the tomb, surrounded by frightened Roman soldiers. The left-hand panel depicts John the Baptist, while the right-hand panel shows Martina of Rome. These saints are, respectively, the patrons and namesakes of printer Jan Moretus of the Plantin Press, and his widow Martina Plantin, who placed the commission for the triptych.

References

External links
http://www.wga.hu/frames-e.html?/html/r/rubens/11religi/05resur.html

Paintings by Peter Paul Rubens
1612 paintings
Rubens
Paintings in the Cathedral of Our Lady (Antwerp)